Mount Bou Nasser or Jbel Bou Naceur is a mountain in Sefrou Province, Fès-Meknès, Morocco. Its altitude is 3,340 meters.

Geography
It is the highest peak in the Middle Atlas, located near Tirnest to the south and Tinesmet to the north. A high peak covered by cedar forests, the Bou Nasser summit is one of the favourite destinations for hikers in the region of the Atlas Mountains.

See also
Middle Atlas

References

External links
Geographic coordinates for Djebel Bou Naceur

Mountains of Morocco
Geography of Fès-Meknès